Thoasia surinamensis, the Suriname pentagonal arboreal carabid, is a species of beetle in the family Carabidae. It is found in Suriname.

Description
They are macropterous and capable of flight. Standard body length is 4.12 mm. Elytra shiny olivaceous. Forebody and head also shiny. Pronotum moderately narrow. Abdomen Sparsely setiferous.

References

Lebiinae
Beetles described in 2018